Kang Young-hyun (born December 19, 1993), known professionally as Young K, is a Korean musician, singer, songwriter, and rapper. He is best known as the bassist, vocalist and rapper of South Korean rock band Day6.

Early life 
Kang was born on December 19, 1993, in Goyang, Gyeonggi Province, South Korea. He was raised in Ilsan, South Korea and moved to Toronto, Canada, to attend middle and high school at York Mills Collegiate Institute. Since sixth grade, he has not lived with his parents. During this time, he went by his English name, Brian Kang. 
Kang moved to Korea in 2010 and became a trainee at JYP Entertainment (JYP). After he signed a contract with JYP, his father retired and moved to Toronto with his mother.
On October 5, 2017, he received his bachelor's degree in Business Administration from Dongguk University. He graduated from University on August 23, 2018.

Career

2010–2015: Pre-debut 
During his time in high school, Kang pursued music in a three-member band called "3rd Degree". They performed at various locations in Toronto and put up videos on YouTube (including some original songs composed by Kang).

In 2010, Kang and his bandmate, Don Lee, were contacted by JYP Entertainment for an audition and were accepted as trainees. Lee later left JYP to pursue a career in dentistry. Kang went on to appear in the fourth episode of WIN: Who is Next? as a part of JYP's rapping team with Got7's Mark Tuan and Jackson Wang against the combined rapping teams of Team A and Team B, where he became known for the verse, "YG, get an attitude!" He was also a part of JYP's vocalist team alongside his eventual Day6 bandmates Junhyeok, Jae, Sungjin and Wonpil.

In 2014, Kang was selected as a member of five-member rock band 5Live under JYP, but their debut was cancelled. The band was reformed as Day6 after the addition of drummer Dowoon in 2015.

2015–present: Day6, Solo activities, Even of Day and solo debut 
On September 7, 2015, he made his debut as a member of Day6 and released their debut EP, The Day, with the lead single "Congratulations".

Kang has been credited with much of the songwriting in Day6's discography.

In September 2015, he was featured in fellow JYP artist, the solo artist Baek A-yeon song titled “Shouldn’t Have” where he did and wrote the rap part. The song went on to become a sleeper hit, reaching number one on several Korean music real-time charts a month after its release among fierce competition. He was also featured in a song of Korean indie musicians Park Sae-byul & Like Likes, in the song titled "Sky High": Kang did the rap part. He has also been featured as rapper in JYP label mate Park Ji-min's single "Young해". 

On March 14, 2018, he made his debut as a member of Day6 in Japan with first Japanese single "If ～また逢えたら～". The single also serves as theme song for the Japanese drama Repeat.

In 2019, he composed and contributed lyrics to a track for the solo debut of B.A.P's Youngjae entitled "Hope".

Together with Got7's Youngjae he became the new DJ of MBC Radio Idol Radio starting from May 18, 2020. The first season of the show ended on September 25.

On August 31, 2020, Kang, Dowoon and Wonpil debuted as Even of Day, a sub-unit of Day6 and released their debut EP The Book of Us: Gluon, with the lead single "Where the Sea Sleeps" (파도가 끝나는 곳까지).

On September 19, 2020, Young K collaborated with American pop duo X Lovers with a remix version of "Love".

On October 16 and 23, 2020, Kang and Wonpil made a surprise appearance as a cameo in the web drama Let Me Off the Earth.

On November 23, 2020, Kang became the new DJ for Kiss The Radio.

On January 14, 2021, Kang featured as rapper in Thai singer Apiwat Ueathavornsuk (Stamp)'s single "Sugar High".

On May 28, 2021, Kang featured in Ben&Ben remake song 'Leaves' and this also comes as Kang's first collaboration with a Filipino act  

On September 6, 2021, Kang made his solo debut with the extended play Eternal and its title track "Guard You".

Personal life 
On August 16, 2021, Young K announced that he will enlist as part of his mandatory military service on October 12, 2021, where he will be serving in KATUSA. During his military service, Young K won the “2022 Eighth Army Best Warrior Competition” in KATUSA category, held from May 8 to May 13, 2022. He was awarded the Army Commendation Medal along with additional gifts from local military support groups and many other rewards.On November 20, the Eighth Army (US 8th Army) released the current situation of Young K, who had just been promoted to Sgt (US Army Sergeant Major, a rank equivalent to Sergeant Major in the Republic of Korea Army), through its official SNS, an official on November 20. 

He also appeared in the 8th episode of tvN variety program, The Backpacker Chef, which aired on July 14, 2022.

Discography

Extended plays

Singles

Songwriting credits 
The lists of songwriting credits below is the lists that Young K was credited for other artists, besides Day6 and his solo.

Source: KOMCA

Filmography

Television series

Web series

Radio presenting

Variety show

Notes

References

External links

1993 births
Living people
JYP Entertainment artists
South Korean bass guitarists
South Korean male rappers
South Korean male singers
South Korean pop rock singers
Day6 members
Male bass guitarists
21st-century bass guitarists
21st-century male musicians